Francesco Puntoriere (born 23 April 1998) is an Italian football player. He plays for Serie D club Lavello.

Club career
He made his Serie B debut for Virtus Entella on 1 March 2016 in a game against Salernitana.

On 31 January 2019, he joined Virtus Francavilla on loan.

On 30 August 2019, he returned to Virtus Francavilla on a permanent basis.  On 31 January 2020, he was loaned to Virtus Verona until the end of the season.

On 12 January 2022, his contract with Virtus Francavilla was terminated by mutual consent and he moved to Serie D club RG Ticino.

References

External links
 

1998 births
Sportspeople from Reggio Calabria
Footballers from Calabria
Living people
Italian footballers
Association football forwards
Italy youth international footballers
Virtus Entella players
U.S. Catanzaro 1929 players
Serie B players
Serie C players
Serie D players
Virtus Francavilla Calcio players
Virtus Verona players